"Tommy" is an 1890 poem by Rudyard Kipling, reprinted in his 1892 Barrack-Room Ballads. The poem addresses the ordinary British soldier of Kipling's time in a sympathetic manner. It is written from the point of view of such a soldier, and contrasts the treatment they receive from the general public during peace and during war.

Background
The Tommy of the poem is Tommy Atkins, a generic slang name for a common British soldier. A term of uncertain origin, the name "Thomas Atkins" was used in nineteenth century War Office manuals as a placeholder name to demonstrate how forms should be filled out. In popular use, "Thomas" became the more familiar "Tommy".

The poem
The poem comprises five verses of eight lines each and is written in a colloquial style of English. The second half of each verse begins with a variation of the refrain "it's Tommy this, an' Tommy that".

The narrator is a British soldier who describes the poor treatment he receives at home when he is not needed to fight a war (for example, he laments being refused service by a pub owner for being a "redcoat"). This is contrasted with the respectful way he is treated by civilians during wartime.

Tommy rejects both sides of this duality, saying that he and his fellow soldiers are neither "thin red 'eroes" nor "blackguards", but just ordinary men. The soldier calls for those who talk of improving things for soldiers to take action, and the poem ends by claiming that "Tommy" is well aware of the way he is treated.

T. S. Eliot included the poem in his 1941 collection A Choice of Kipling's Verse.

Notes

References

External links
Tommy at kiplingsociety.co.uk
Barrack-Room Ballads at Project Gutenberg, which contains "Tommy"

Poetry by Rudyard Kipling
Characters in poems